Thomas Cavanagh (born October 26, 1963) is a Canadian actor. He is known for a variety of roles on American television, including starring roles in Ed (2000–2004), Love Monkey (2006) and Trust Me (2009), and recurring roles on Providence and Scrubs. Since 2014, he has portrayed Eobard Thawne / Reverse-Flash, and the various versions of Harrison Wells, on The CW television series The Flash; Cavanagh also directed several episodes of The Flash.

Early life
Thomas Cavanagh was born on October 26, 1963, in Ottawa, Ontario, to a Roman Catholic family of Irish descent. Cavanagh moved with his family to Winneba, a small city in Ghana when he was a child.

In his teens, the family moved to Lennoxville, Quebec when his father became the Academic Dean of Champlain College. He attended the Séminaire de Sherbrooke, where he studied in French and played basketball for the Barons. He later studied at Champlain College in Lennoxville at the CEGEP level. While attending Queen's University, Kingston, Ontario, he became interested in theatre and music and played ice hockey and varsity basketball. He graduated in 1987 with degrees in English, biology and education.

Career

Commercial credits
Cavanagh acted in his native Canada for many years, appearing on television dramas such as Jake and the Kid in the late 1990s, and television commercials, appearing for  Oh Henry! chocolate bars and Labatt Blue Light beer commercials in the 1990s and for CIBC.

Broadway roles
In 1989, he was cast in the Broadway revival of Shenandoah. Other stage credits include productions of A Chorus Line, Cabaret, Brighton Beach Memoirs, Urinetown and Grease. He appeared in the 2008 production of Some Americans Abroad at Second Stage Theatre in New York City.

Television performances
After gaining notice for his recurring role as Doug the Dog Guy in the NBC television program Providence, Cavanagh was cast as the title character in the NBC program Ed.  Cavanagh received a Golden Globe nomination and a TV Guide Award for his work on Ed, which ran for four seasons beginning in October 2000 and concluding in February 2004.

Cavanagh first guest starred on the sitcom Scrubs in 2002’s "My Big Brother" where he played Dan Dorian, the brother of lead character J.D., cast because of his resemblance to Zach Braff. He  made six subsequent appearances in the series, culminating with Braff's final episode as a series regular, the eighth season finale, "My Finale".

In 2005, Cavanagh filmed a pilot, Love Monkey, with Jason Priestley, Judy Greer and Larenz Tate. The show was selected by CBS as a midseason replacement and debuted on January 17, 2006. Love Monkey was given an eight-episode order, but only three aired on CBS before the show was placed on indefinite hiatus due to low ratings. VH1 bought all eight episodes and played them in their entirety in the spring of 2006.

He starred in the Lifetime Movie Network television miniseries The Capture Of The Green River Killer in which he portrayed King County sheriff David Reichert. In March 2006, Cavanagh filmed My Ex-Life, a comedy pilot for CBS about a divorced couple who remain friends. The pilot featured Lost actress Cynthia Watros as his ex-wife. CBS did not select the show for its fall 2006 schedule. Cavanagh portrayed the lead role Nick Snowden (the heir to the Santa Claus identity) in the made-for-TV movie Snow in 2005, which is shown annually on the Family Channel.

In 2008, Cavanagh appeared in the short-lived ABC series Eli Stone, playing the father of the title character.  From January to April 2009, Cavanagh starred in the television drama Trust Me, co-starring Eric McCormack, which aired on TNT until cancellation due to low ratings.

Cavanagh hosted Stories from the Vaults on Smithsonian Networks from 2008 to 2009. He made a guest appearance in the mid-season premiere of the USA Network show Royal Pains as former professional golfer Jack O'Malley. In 2012, he starred in Lifetime's A Killer Among Us remake.

From 2014 to 2021, Cavanagh was a series regular on The CW's live-action television series The Flash, portraying both Eobard Thawne / Reverse-Flash and the various versions of Harrison Wells. He left the series as a regular cast member after its seventh season, but continued to make recurring appearances in its eighth season.

Film performances
Cavanagh starred in the 2002 film Bang Bang You're Dead. Prior to Ed, Cavanagh's film appearances were mainly in supporting roles. After that series ended, he had his first starring role as an escaped convict in the thriller Heart of the Storm. In 2005, he starred in the romantic comedy Alchemy, opposite Sarah Chalke; in 2006, he appeared in another romantic comedy, Gray Matters.

In 2006, Cavanagh began filming Breakfast with Scot, in which he plays a gay retired hockey player who becomes an adoptive father to a young boy. The film, released in 2007, drew attention as the first gay-themed film ever to win approval from a major league sports franchise to use its real name and logo; Cavanagh's character formerly played for the Toronto Maple Leafs. In 2007 he starred in the second installment of the direct-to-DVD Raw Feed horror film series from Warner Home Video, Sublime. He starred as Ranger Smith in the feature film Yogi Bear (2010).

Podcast
From 2010 until 2016, Cavanagh co-hosted the podcast Mike and Tom Eat Snacks, with his Ed castmate Michael Ian Black, on the Nerdist Podcast Network. They re-launced the podcast in August, 2021 on the Starburns Audio podcast network.

Personal life
Cavanagh married Maureen Grise, an image editor for Sports Illustrated, on July 31, 2004, in a Catholic ceremony on Nantucket, Massachusetts. The couple have two daughters and two sons. Cavanagh ran the 2006 New York City Marathon.

In summer 2008, he founded the Cavanagh Classic, an annual celebrity basketball tournament in Rucker Park in Harlem to raise money and awareness for Nothing But Nets. The charity's goal is to combat malaria by sending mosquito nets to families that need them. Cavanagh travelled to Rwanda on a March 2009 United Nations Foundation trip to distribute the nets and educate the recipients in their use.

Filmography

Film

Television

As a director
Ed (2000–2004) – three episodes
The Flash (2017–2018) – episodes: "The Once and Future Flash", "Elongated Journey Into Night" and the 100th episode, "What's Past Is Prologue".
Superman & Lois (2021-2023) - two episodes

Video games
 Yogi Bear: The Video Game (2010); as Ranger Smith (voice role)

References

External links
 
 Two Weeks movie site
 Mike and Tom Eat Snacks
 Biography in Playbill

 Variety.com article about Love Monkey
 Tom Cavanagh Is the Inside Man for the 'Vaults' Job

1963 births
20th-century Canadian male actors
21st-century Canadian male actors
Male actors from Ottawa
Canadian podcasters
Canadian male film actors
Canadian male stage actors
Canadian male television actors
Canadian male voice actors
Canadian people of Irish descent
Canadian Roman Catholics
Canadian television directors
Living people
Queen's University at Kingston alumni